The Cure is a 2018 Philippine television drama thriller series broadcast by GMA Network. Directed by Mark A. Reyes, it stars Jennylyn Mercado in the title role and Tom Rodriguez. It premiered on April 30, 2018 on the network's Telebabad line up replacing Sherlock Jr. The series concluded on July 27, 2018 with a total of 65 episodes. It was replaced by Victor Magtanggol on its timeslot.

The series is streaming online on YouTube.

Premise
The life of Greg, Charity and Hope take a turn when Greg's mother is diagnosed with late-stage cancer. Desperate to find a treatment, Greg gets his hands on an experimental drug made by Evangeline Lazaro and gives it to his mother. The drug becomes the root of an infection that threatens to spread all over the city. Greg, Charity, Evangeline and her son, Joshua will start to find a cure.

Cast and characters

Lead cast
 Jennylyn Mercado as Charity “Charie” Valdez-Salvador
 Tom Rodriguez as Gregory “Greg” Salvador

Supporting cast
 Mark Herras as Darius
 LJ Reyes as Katrina Contes
 Jay Manalo as Fernan / Supremo
 Jaclyn Jose as Evangeline Lazaro
 Ronnie Henares as Eduardo
 Diva Montelaba as Suzy
 Arra San Agustin as Anna Mercado-Lazaro
 Leanne Bautista as Hope V. Salvador

Guest cast
 Ken Chan as Joshua "Josh" Lazaro
 Irma Adlawan as Agnes Salvador
 Glenda Garcia as Lorna Valdez
 Maricris Garcia as Josie
 John Feir as Jimboy Marquez
 Jhoana Marie Tan as April Sison
 Gerald Madrid as Lito Sison
 Edwin Reyes as Jomalesa
 Jenzel Angeles as Josie
 Angela Evangelista as MY
 Bruce Roeland as Dex
 Jacob Briz as Yel
 Jazz Yburan as Aja
 Vincent Magbanua as Lowie
 Yul Servo as Lando
 Kris Bernal as Myra
 Matt Evans as Elmer
 Kiel Rodriguez as Arvin
 Shyr Valdez as Becky
 Teresa Loyzaga as Mariz Almijarez
 Renz Valerio as Cesar
 Lotlot de Leon as Rosita
 Kylie Padilla as Adira Aguilar
 Emilio Garcia as Rudy Aguilar
 Pen Medina as Rigor
 Ruru Madrid as Xavier
 Janice Hung as Valda

Accolades

References

External links
 
 

2018 Philippine television series debuts
2018 Philippine television series endings
Filipino-language television shows
GMA Network drama series
Philippine science fiction television series
Television shows set in the Philippines
Thriller television series
Zombies in television